Governor Roberts may refer to:

Albert H. Roberts (1868–1946), 33rd Governor of Tennessee
Barbara Roberts (born 1936), 34th Governor of Oregon
Colin Roberts (diplomat) (born 1959), Governor of the Falkland Islands from 2014 to 2017
Dennis J. Roberts (1903–1994), 63rd Governor of Rhode Island
Henry Roberts (governor) (1853–1929), 61st Governor of Connecticut
Oran Milo Roberts (1815–1898), 17th Governor of Texas